The Open Desktop Workstation, also referred to as ODW is a PowerPC based computer, by San Antonio-based Genesi.  The ODW has an interchangeable CPU card allowing for a wide range of PowerPC microprocessors from IBM and Freescale Semiconductor.

It is a standardized version of the Pegasos II. It was the first open source based PowerPC computer and gave PowerPC a host/target development environment. Genesi have released the complete specification (design and component listing) free of charge. The ODW-derived Home Media Center won the Best in Show award at the Freescale Technology Forum in 2005. It also features an ATI certification and a "Ready for IBM Technology" certification.

It supports a variety of operating systems such as MorphOS, Linux, QNX and OpenSolaris. Manufacturing of the ODW have been discontinued in favour for EFIKA.

Specification

 Freescale 1.0 GHz MPC7447 processor
 512 MB DDR RAM (two slots, up to 2 GB)
 80 GB ATA100 hard disk
 Dual-Layer DVD±RW Drive
 Floppy disk support
 3× PCI slots
 AGP based ATI Radeon 9250 graphics (DVI, VGA and S-Video out)
 4× USB
 PS/2 mouse and keyboard support
 3× FireWire 400 (two external)
 2× Ethernet ports, 100 Mbit/s and 1 Gbit
 AC'97 sound - in/out, analog and digital (S/PDIF)
 PC game/MIDI-port
 Parallel and serial ports (supporting IrDA)
 MicroATX motherboard (236×172 mm)
 Small Footprint Case - (92×310×400 mm)

References

External links
 Genesi's ODW page
 ODW specification at PowerDeveloper.org
 Linux resources for ODW at Freescale

PowerPC mainboards